The deputy governor of Jakarta consisted of four officials who is hierarchically under the Governor of Jakarta. The deputy governor of Jakarta is tasked to assist the Governor of Jakarta in specific tasks. Unlike the vice governor of Jakarta, the deputy governor is appointed by the President of Indonesia with the recommendation of the governor.

Formation 
Prior to the formation of the deputy governor, the post of the vice governor of Jakarta was held by multiple officials. Between 1964 to 1966, the post of vice governor was held by two officeholders. From 1966 until 2002, a total of four officeholders held the office. This custom was abolished in 2002, when on 7 October 2002, Governor Sutiyoso was inaugurated along with his single vice governor Fauzi Bowo.

On 30 July 2007, the Law No. 29 of 2007 about the status of Jakarta was enacted. The law legally established the office of the Deputy Governor. The position of the deputy governor was further specified in the Presidential Regulation about the office, tasks, function, and responsibilities of the deputy governor and in the Gubernatorial Regulation on the same topic.

The office remained unseated for about two years until the inauguration of the deputy governors on 6 March 2009 by Fauzi Bowo.

Division of work 
There are four different deputy governors, and each deputy governor is assigned with different tasks.
 Deputy Governor for Spatial Planning and Environment
 Deputy Governor for Population and Settlement Control
 Deputy Governor for Industry, Trade and Transport
 Deputy Governor for Culture and Tourism

Functions 
According to the Law No. 29 of 2007, the deputy governor is assigned to assist the Governor of Jakarta in the governance of Jakarta.
This

List of Deputy Governors of Jakarta

Deputy Governor for Spatial Planning and Environment

Deputy Governor for Population and Settlement Control

Deputy Governor for Industry, Trade and Transport

Deputy Governor for Culture and Tourism

Notes

References 

Government of Indonesia
Vice Governors of Jakarta